This article lists events from the year 2017 in Mozambique.

Incumbents
 President: Filipe Nyusi
 Prime Minister: Carlos Agostinho do Rosário

Events

15 February – The tropical cyclone Dineo struck the coast of Mozambique. At least seven people were killed across the country, and an estimated 20,000 homes were destroyed and approximately 130,000 people were directly affected. Dineo was the first tropical cyclone to hit Mozambique since Cyclone Jokwe in 2008. 

The 2017 Lusophony Games will be hosted in Maputo

Deaths

References

Links

 
Years of the 21st century in Mozambique
Mozambique
Mozambique
2010s in Mozambique